"Rome Wasn't Built in a Day" is a song by English musical group Morcheeba. It was released in Europe on 3 July 2000 as the lead single from their third studio album, Fragments of Freedom (2000), and was given a UK release on 24 July. The song is the group's biggest hit in their native United Kingdom, where it peaked at number 34. In New Zealand, the song reached number two and was the 13th-most-successful single of 2000. Elsewhere, the single reached the top 40 in Australia, Italy, and Switzerland. "Rome Wasn't Built in a Day" is reported to have reached the top 10 in 10 countries.

Track listings
All versions of "In the Hands of the Gods" feature Biz Markie.

UK CD1 and cassette single
 "Rome Wasn't Built in a Day" – 3:34
 "Frogmarched to Freedom" – 4:59
 "In the Hands of the Gods" (Tumbleweed Gunslinger mix) – 4:16

UK CD2
 "Rome Wasn't Built in a Day" – 3:34
 "In the Hands of the Gods" (Cheeky Cheeba Chainsaw mix) – 3:19
 "Rome Wasn't Built in a Day" (video)

European CD single
 "Rome Wasn't Built in a Day" – 3:34
 "In the Hands of the Gods" (Tumbleweed Gunslinger mix) – 4:15

Australian CD single
 "Rome Wasn't Built in a Day" – 3:34
 "In the Hands of the Gods" (Cheeky Cheeba Chainsaw mix) – 3:19
 "Frogmarched to Freedom" – 4:59
 "In the Hands of the Gods" (Tumbleweed Gunslinger mix) – 4:15
 "Rome Wasn't Built in a Day" (enhanced video)

Credits and personnel
Credits are lifted from the Fragments of Freedom album booklet.

Studio
 Recorded and mixed at Morcheeba Heads Quarter (South London, England)

Personnel

 Paul Godfrey – writing, production, mixing, arrangement
 Ross Godfrey – writing, production, mixing, arrangement
 Skye Edwards – writing, all vocals
 Derek Green – backing vocals, additional vocal production
 Paul Jason Fredericks – backing vocals
 Joy Rose – backing vocals
 Dee Lewis – backing vocals
 Steve Gordon – bass
 Dan Goldman – Fender Rhodes piano, Hammond C3 organ
 Martin Carling – drums
 Chris White – tenor and baritone saxophone
 Steve Sidwell – trumpet
 Steve Bentley-Klein – violin, string arrangement
 Pete Norris – production, mixing, arrangement

Charts

Weekly charts

Year-end charts

Release history

References

2000 singles
2000 songs
East West Records singles
Morcheeba songs
Warner Music Group singles